The 2022 TCR Denmark Touring Car Series is the third season of the TCR Denmark Touring Car Series.

Teams and drivers

Calendar and results 
The 2022 calendar was introduced on November 29, 2021.

Championship Standings 
 Scoring system

Drivers' Championship

References

External links 
 

Motorsport competitions in Denmark
Denmark
TCR